The Territorial Prelature of Infanta is a Roman Catholic territorial prelature located in the municipality of Infanta, Quezon, in the Ecclesiastical province of Lipa in the Philippines.

Prelates

References

Sources
 GCatholic.org
 Catholic Hierarchy
 Prelature website 

Roman Catholic dioceses in the Philippines
Infanta
Christian organizations established in 1950
Roman Catholic dioceses and prelatures established in the 20th century
Territorial prelatures
1950 establishments in the Philippines
Religion in Quezon